Filot is a village and district of the municipality of Hamoir, located in the province of Liège in Wallonia, Belgium.

In 1914, during World War I, German troops were lodged in the village. The village church dates from 1531, and was rebuilt in 1648. The village also contains some historical residential houses.

Notable residents
  (1923–1980), poet and composer, born in Filot

References

External links

Populated places in Liège Province